Treat Huey and Denis Kudla defeated Oscar Otte and Jan-Lennard Struff in the final, 7–6(12–10), 3–6, [10–6], to win the doubles tennis title at the 2022 Arizona Tennis Classic.

Jamie Murray and Neal Skupski were the defending champions, but did not return to defend their title.

Seeds

Draw

References

External links
 Main draw

Arizona Tennis Classic - Doubles